The Churchill Club was a group of eight teenage schoolboys from Aalborg Cathedral School in the north of Jutland who performed acts of sabotage against the Germans during the occupation of Denmark in the Second World War.

The Churchill Club was one of the earliest resistance groups to be formed in Denmark. Under the leadership of 16-year-old Knud Pedersen, their activities began at the end of 1941 when they began to target the German occupation forces in Aalborg to imitate the resistance of Norwegian soldiers. They succeeded in carrying out 25 acts of sabotage before they were arrested by the police in May 1942.  Some of those acts of sabotage included stealing weapons and destroying vehicles, blueprints, and plane parts. The boys were charged with a fine of 1,860 million kroner for the destroyed Nazi property; their sentences ranged from one and a half to five years in prison. Even after imprisonment, some of the boys managed to escape at night to continue their sabotage activities for some time.

The RAF Club
On April 9, 1940 the German Army invaded Denmark with little resistance. 14-year old Knud Peterson and his family saw the horrific acts of violence the German troops committed against their people. Knud and his older brother Jens also saw how Norway was fighting the invasion and felt shame in their country for giving in within just a few hours. Knud, along with his friends and family, started a small resistance group in Odense, Denmark. They named themselves the RAF after the British Royal Air Force because of the high level of respect they had for them. They started with small acts of sabotage such as cutting phone lines of German Military Headquarters, and turning around or breaking German street direction signs. They performed these small acts through the summer and fall of 1940. In April 1941, Pedersen moved to Aalborg, forming the Churchill Club there. This was a very brave act and got lots of respect. Meanwhile, the RAF Club stayed active and eventually was in friendly competition with the Churchill Club.

Formation of the Churchill Club

In the spring of 1941, Knud Pedersen and his family moved 150 miles north to Aalborg, Denmark. It wasn't until a few days before Christmas of 1941 when Knud wanted to bring the rebellious acts from Odense to Aalborg. Knud and his friends called themselves the Churchill Club after Prime Minister of United Kingdom Winston Churchill. They performed their acts of sabotage in the daylight using their bicycles as their form of transportation. They acted in the daytime because at night everything was guarded more heavily. One of their main acts of resistance was painting their symbol on street signs and on the homes and offices of Nazi soldiers. One of their first acts of sabotage was painting the words “War Profiteer” in blue paint on the front of businesses that dealt with the Nazis.

Symbol
The symbol of the Churchill Club imitated the Nazi swastika, it was blue with arrows at the end of each line. The symbol stood for “Flames of Rebellion!”

Acts of Sabotage

In February 1942, the boys of the Churchill Club devised a plan to raid the Fuchs Construction offices at Aalborg airport, an important Luftwaffe base housing 150 bombers used to attack targets in Norway and to protect German ships. The Fuchs construction company was a local company paid by the German Army to build hangars and runways. The boys surreptitiously got past a guarded bridge and made their way to its offices and set a fire inside the main office, destroying blueprints and records. The building did not burn down, but it was their first large scale sabotage.

The Churchill Club always took the opportunity to destroy German vehicles, sometimes by bending their radiator, or dropping a lit match into the fuel tank.

The Churchill Club would patrol the town on a regular basis and take any opportunity to steal German soldiers' guns while their backs were turned. Being unfamiliar with guns, they never used them, but they would stockpile them and turn them into homemade explosives for sabotage missions.

On May 2, 1942, the Churchill Club, using discs from mortar grenades, blew up the Aalborg railroad yard, which was the town's main Nazi base. The railroad cars that they blew up contained airplane wings, machinery, and Swedish iron ore likely destined for the German war effort.  Danish firemen were slow to put out the flames, fearing additional explosions.  This was one of their most successful attacks.

Arrest and Trial
May 8, 1942 a waitress (Elsa Ottesen) saw two members of the Churchill Club enter a large cafe and go straight for the coat closet, where later a (German) soldier reported a stolen pistol. Witnesses identified the two boys outside their private school. Later that night, Knud was arrested and the Germans took their stockpile of stolen weapons. Everyone who was involved was arrested that night. They were sent to King Hans Gades Jail to await the judge's verdict. Then later sent to State Prison in Nyborg with sentences ranging from a year and 6 months to 3 years. In October 1942, a few boys (Kaj and Alf Houlberg and Knud Hornbo) managed to escape King Hans Gades Jail for 19 consecutive nights, having sawed loose a window bar, and perform more acts of sabotage. After the boys were recaptured, attacks from the Churchill Club ceased.

Meeting Winston Churchill

Books
Knud Pedersen has written four books about the Churchill Club; all were republished in an omnibus edition in 2005.
 
 
 
 
 

Bjarne Reuter's fictional book Drengene fra St. Petri is based on the activities of the Churchill Club. It has been published in English as The Boys of St. Petri.

The story of Knud Pedersen and the Churchill Club is also told in a book by an American author, Phillip Hoose, titled The Boys who Challenged Hitler. It features the story as told by Knud Pedersen himself, and also talks about the RAF Club, another sabotage club founded by Knud when he lived in the city of Odense, Denmark.

Adaptations and related works
The popular 1991 movie, The Boys from St. Petri  (in Danish: Drengene Fra Sankt Petri), is based on the Churchill Club but goes beyond the facts of the case.

Phillip Hoose's non-fiction book, The Boys who Challenged Hitler: Knud Pederson and the Churchill Club (2015), tells the story of the Churchill Club.

References

External links
 Website about the Churchill Club 
 Knud Pedersen, the leader of the group, gives a short overview of the Churchill Club with photographs in a video presentation (in Danish): Et medlem af Churchill-klubben (retrieved 23 April 2008)

Danish resistance groups
World War II resistance movements
History of Aalborg